C'est La Vie is a Mauritian TV Series directed and produced by Romesh Sharma. This TV series enjoyed by a lot of Mauritians was later converted into a full fledge movie called Dil Jo Bhi Kahey.

Cast

Main
  Karan Sharma as Jay

References

Mauritian television series